Steam Portland is a gay bathhouse located in the Kerns neighborhood of northeast Portland, Oregon, United States. It opened in 2003. The bathhouse has been called "sleek".

See also
 Sex clubs in Portland, Oregon

References

External links
 
 
 A Newer, Gentler Den of Sin: Getting Your Gay On at Steam Portland by Justin Sanders (February 20, 2003), The Portland Mercury

2003 establishments in Oregon
Companies established in 2003
Gay bathhouses in Oregon
Kerns, Portland, Oregon
LGBT culture in Portland, Oregon
Northeast Portland, Oregon